Nasiczne  (Nasichne) is a village in the administrative district of Gmina Lutowiska, within Bieszczady County, Subcarpathian Voivodeship, in south-eastern Poland, close to the border with Ukraine.

The village has a population of 49.

References

Nasiczne